Sangsu station is a subway station on Seoul Subway Line 6. Along with Hongik University station on Line 2, it serves the area commonly called Hongdae, albeit geographically less convenient. The name of the subway station comes from its local name. The local name means the top of the river.

Station layout

References

Railway stations opened in 2000
Seoul Metropolitan Subway stations
Metro stations in Mapo District